Kargasoksky District  is an administrative and municipal district (raion), one of the sixteen in Tomsk Oblast, Russia. It is located in the northern, western, and southwestern parts of the oblast. Its administrative center is the rural locality (a selo) of Kargasok. Population: 21,814 (2010 Census);  The population of Kargasok accounts for 37.3% of the district's total population.

Geography
At , it is the largest district by area in Tomsk Oblast, accounting for over a quarter of its total territory.

History
In its present form, the district has existed since 1959.

Demographics
95.7% of the population are ethnic Russians. Selkups at 2.1% and Khanty people at 0.6% represent the minorities.

Economy
Natural resources include oil, peat and clay, sand. The district produces 60% of oil and all of the natural gas in Tomsk Oblast. 2008 oil production was at 7.4 million tons.

References

Notes

Sources

Districts of Tomsk Oblast